The country of Barbados is divided into sub-regions known as parishes.

Terminology
They are legally styled as the "Parish of (parish name)" as opposed to the American naming convention with "Parish" coming after the name. The use of the term "parish" derives from the island's religious Anglican history under the Church of England.

History
The system of parish churches was originally based on the system of the Church of England and was the visible expression forming the basis of the parliamentary representation in Barbados. The differing size and shape of each parish were primarily influenced by the large plantation estates of cotton, sugar cane and tobacco that existed during the colonial years of Barbados. As various chapels of ease were created during the 17th century across the island, some local churches were elevated to parish church status, leading to the formation of new parishes surrounding those freshly created vestries.

By 1629, the English settlers after landing at James Town formed six original parishes on the island which were:
The Parish of Christ Church,
The Parish of St. James,
The Parish of St. Lucy,
The Parish of St. Michael,
The Parish of St. Peter, and
The Parish of St. Thomas

By 1645, the land holding of Barbados increased and the shape of the original six was reconfigured giving way to an additional five parishes. Some prior churches of the state within the existing parishes were elevated to the level of parish church and as a consequence they formed new parishes around those new vestries:
The Parish of St. Andrew,
The Parish of St. George,
The Parish of St. John,
The Parish of St. Joseph, and
The Parish of St. Philip.

Thus Barbados was converted into the current eleven parishes of today corresponding to the earlier church parishes. As was common under the British system, each parish had a single main parishional church (or cathedral in the case of Bridgetown having been elevated to city status), which acted as a sort of capital for each parish. The parishes each held their own local government councils until these were abolished in 1959, following a brief administrative districting experiment within Barbados until 1967.

Today

The nation's capital Bridgetown, which is located within the parish of Saint Michael, may one day be made into its own parish.

Within the country, travel is unrestricted to everyone in moving about from parish to parish. With increasing urban sprawl and new construction projects across the country many neighbourhoods and even parishional border-lines today are ill-defined.

The eleven parishes are:

See also 
 Constituency Councils
 Geography of Barbados
 History of Barbados
 Transport in Barbados
 Barbadian vehicle registration plates
 ISO 3166-2:BB
 List of cities in Barbados
 List of West Indian first-level country subdivisions
 List of Caribbean islands by area
 List of Caribbean islands by political affiliation
 List of Caribbean island countries by population
 List of metropolitan areas in the West Indies

References

Further reading

External links

 Barbados parishes
 Barbados Statistical Service (BSS)
Barbados Government census by Parish

 
Subdivisions of Barbados
Barbados, Parishes
Barbados 1
Parishes, Barbados
Barbados geography-related lists